Arat is a Persian and Turkish male given name and also a surname. Notable people with the name include:

Arat Dink, Turkish journalist
Can Arat, Turkish footballer

The term can also refer to:
 Arat (The Walking Dead), a fictional character from the television series The Walking Dead
 Aromatic-amino-acid transaminase, enzyme

Turkish-language surnames
Turkish masculine given names